is a Japanese transportation/tourism company based in Hiroshima, Japan.

Ferries
Ujina Port - Etajima
Kure Port - Etajima
Hiroshima Port - Matsuyama

Hydrofoils
Hiroshima Port - Hiroshima Prince Hotel - Kannon - Miyajima
Ujina Port - Hiroshima Prince Hotel - Etajima

Cruising
Hiroshima Port - Etajima
Kure - Kure

External links
 First Beach

Companies based in Hiroshima Prefecture
Tourist attractions in Hiroshima
Ferry companies of Japan
Transport in Hiroshima